Sir Philip John Hunter CBE (born 1939, Northumberland) is an English educationist who was the Schools Adjudicator for England from 2002 to 2009.

Early life
He passed the eleven plus, but as the nearest grammar school was too distant, he went to the Quaker School, Ackworth School (boarding school) in Yorkshire. He studied Zoology at Kings College, Newcastle.

Career
He lectured and undertook research for two years at the University of Khartoum in Sudan then for three years at the Agricultural Research Council (became the AFRC in 1983 then the BBSRC in 1994) in Cambridge. His research was into the effects of pesticide on slugs and snails, and the spread of the disease Bilharzia. He worked at the DES and Civil Service College (now known as the National School of Government) for ten years, including serving as Principal Private Secretary to two Secretaries of State. He became Deputy Chief Education Officer at ILEA then Chief Education Officer at Staffordshire LEA.

Schools Adjudicator
He became the Chief Schools Adjudicator on 1 September 2002 operating from an office based in Mowden, Darlington on the site of a former private school. In December 2009 he stepped down and was replaced by Dr Ian Craig.

Recognition
He was knighted in the June 2008 Queen's Birthday Honours for services to Education. He was made a CBE in the 1999 Birthday Honours.

Personal life
He met his wife, Ruth, at the Quaker School, Ackworth. Together, they have three children.

References

External links
 Office of the Schools Adjudicator

1939 births
Educational administrators
Commanders of the Order of the British Empire
People from Northumberland
English educational theorists
Alumni of Newcastle University
Knights Bachelor
Living people
Academic staff of the University of Khartoum
20th-century English educators